Crematogaster alulai is a species of ant in tribe Crematogastrini. It was described by Emery in 1901.

References

alulai
Insects described in 1901